The Lucy Drexel Dahlgren House is a historic home located at 15 East 96th Street between Fifth and Madison Avenues on the border between the Carnegie Hill and East Harlem neighborhoods of the Upper East Side of Manhattan, New York City.

History 

It was designed by Ogden Codman, Jr. and constructed in 1915-16  in the French Renaissance Revival style for Lucy Wharton Drexel Dahlgren, a daughter of financier Joseph William Drexel and his wife Lucy Wharton Drexel.

The limestone house is a companion to Codman's own residence down the street at 7 East 96th Street, which he designed for himself and had built in 1912–13. The AIA Guide to New York City describes the Dahlgren house as "magisterial" and "disciplined." It features "gentle restications and bas-reliefs."

The extremely wealthy and socially prominent Dahlgren spent little time in the house. It was later occupied for many years by Pierre Cartier, the founder of the Cartier's jewelry store. Apparently, Dahlgren rented the house to Cartier from 1922 on, until she sold it to him in 1927. In 1945, on his retirement, Cartier sold the house to the St. Francis de Sales Roman Catholic Church, which used it as a convent for the nuns who taught at the church's parochial school. In 1981, the church sold the house to a private owner, who restored it.

The house was designated a New York City Landmark in 1984, and was added to the National Register of Historic Places in 1989. It is located within the Upper East Side Historic District.

See also
List of New York City Designated Landmarks in Manhattan from 59th to 110th Streets
National Register of Historic Places listings in Manhattan from 59th to 110th Streets

References

External links 

 "The Dahlgren-Cartier House -- 15 East 96th Street"
 Mrs. Lucy Drexel Dahlgren Residence / Pierre Cartier Residence
 New York Times notice of sale

Upper East Side
Houses in Manhattan
Houses on the National Register of Historic Places in Manhattan
Neoclassical architecture in New York City
Houses completed in 1916
New York City Designated Landmarks in Manhattan